Ochwiay Biano (Chief Mountain Lake) was an elder of Taos Pueblo in New Mexico. C. G. Jung, in his book Memories, Dreams, Reflections, recalls a conversation he had with Biano, which Jung reported as follows:

Later in Jung's 1925 visit, Biano taught Jung that his people, like the Elongyi tribe of Kenya, rose in the morning and spit in their palms, thereby presenting their soul-stuff to the sun to welcome it in an expression of sympathetic magic. Jung marveled that the Puebloans knew why they were there.

Notes

Works cited

Pueblo people
20th-century Native Americans